Strohmeyer is a surname. Notable people with the surname include:

Arno Strohmeyer (born 1963), Austrian fencer
Caitlyn Strohmeyer, (born 1965), American transgender advocate and social worker
George Strohmeyer (1924–1992), American football player
Jeremy Strohmeyer (born 1978), American criminal
John Strohmeyer (1924–2010), American journalist
Sarah Strohmeyer, American author